Lyn Stuart (born c. 1955) is an American jurist and the first Republican woman Chief Justice of Alabama and the second woman to hold the office.  She was first appointed by Alabama Governor Kay Ivey as "acting" Chief Justice of the Supreme Court of Alabama on May 6, 2016, when her predecessor, Roy Moore, was suspended from office.  At the time of her initial appointment, she had been an associate justice of the Alabama Supreme Court since 2001, which was the longest tenure for any Republican in the Court's history.  She had been thrice elected as an associate justice in 2000, 2006, and 2012.

In September 2016, Moore's suspension was made permanent, and he resigned in April 2017. Upon Moore's actual resignation she was named by Governor Ivey as chief justice on April 26, 2017, without the "acting" title.  She sought election to a full six-year term in the Republican Primary on June 5, 2018.  However, she lost the Republican nomination for Chief Justice by a relatively narrow 18,826 votes out of more than 514,000 cast.  This translated to a percentage 52%-48% loss to Associate Justice Tom Parker.

Background
Born in Atmore, Alabama, she earned her Bachelor of Arts degree in sociology and education from Auburn University in 1977 and her Juris Doctor degree from the University of Alabama School of Law in 1980. She served as secretary of the Student Bar Association, was a member of the John A. Campbell Moot Court Board, and received the Dean's Service Award at graduation.  She served as an Alabama Assistant Attorney General under Charles Graddick.  In 1988 and 1994 she was elected as a District Court Judge in Baldwin County, Alabama.  In January 1997, she was appointed as a Circuit Judge by Governor Fob James and re-elected without opposition in 1998.  She resigned as a Circuit Judge upon her election to the Alabama Supreme Court.

Stuart and her husband, George, have two sons and a daughter.

References

External links

1955 births
20th-century American lawyers
20th-century American judges
21st-century American judges
Alabama Republicans
Methodists from Alabama
Auburn University alumni
Chief Justices of the Supreme Court of Alabama
Date of birth missing (living people)
Living people
People from Atmore, Alabama
Justices of the Supreme Court of Alabama
University of Alabama alumni
Women chief justices of state supreme courts in the United States
20th-century American women judges
21st-century American women judges